Moraschi is a surname. Notable people with the surname include:

 Laurie Moraschi (1942–2018), Australian rugby league footballer 
 Matilde Moraschi (1910–2004), Italian sprinter and basketball player